Sir Ben Helfgott  (born 22 November 1929) is a Polish-born British Holocaust survivor, Olympian and former champion weightlifter. He is one of two Jewish athletes known to have competed in the Olympics after surviving the Holocaust, along with  Alfred Nakache, a French champion swimmer and water polo player. Helfgott has spent his adult life promoting Holocaust education, meeting with national leaders in the UK to promote cultural integration and peace.

Biography
Helfgott was born in Piotrków Trybunalski, Łódź, Poland. He was 10 years old when Germany invaded the country in 1939. In 1942, he initially convinced the Nazis that he was ethnically Polish, and not a Jew. He was eventually sent to a concentration camp. Initially sent to Buchenwald, Helfgott survived the Holocaust. He was liberated in 1945, but was very weak. He was among 732 orphan refugees under the age of 16 brought to England after the war by CBF World Jewish Relief after being liberated from Theresienstadt; he formed a part of the initial 300 arrivals and thus of the group known as The Windermere Children who were sent to Troutbeck Bridge on arrival. He and one of his sisters were the only members of his family to survive the war; his mother and youngest sister were rounded up and shot by the Nazis.

There are descriptions of his experiences both during and after the Holocaust in Martin Gilbert's book The Boys, The Story of 732 Young Concentration Camp Survivors about 732 young concentration camp survivors who were sent to the United Kingdom after the war.

Weightlifting career
Helfgott won Great Britain's  championship in 1954, and was lightweight champion in 1955, 1956, and 1958. He represented Great Britain at weightlifting in the 1956 Summer Olympics at Melbourne, Australia.

He was the captain of the British weightlifting teams at the 1956 Olympics in Melbourne and the 1960 Olympics in Rome. In addition, he was a bronze medal winner at the 1958 British Empire and Commonwealth Games held in Cardiff, South Wales. Helfgott also won the gold medal in the lightweight class at the 1950, 1953 and 1957 Maccabiah Games.

Media appearances
As a guest on the BBC Radio 4 Desert Island Discs programme on 1 April 2007, he chose to be stranded with a copy of Bertrand Russell's A History of Western Philosophy and a bar with two discs for weight training.

In 2010, Helfgott was one of five British Jews interviewed for an exhibit at the London Jewish Museum exploring "different ways of being Jewish."

In 2018, Helfgott appeared in an edition of the BBC series Who Do You Think You Are? featuring Robert Rinder. In the programme, Helfgott recalled how he had encountered Rinder's maternal grandfather, Moszek (Moses, Morris), in the Schlieben concentration camp.

Personal life
Helfgott married Arza in 1966, with whom he then had three sons and nine grandchildren. He had begun a course at the University of Southampton in 1948 but dropped out after a year and thereafter was partner in a business manufacturing dresses. He lives in London.

Awards, honours and recognition

Poland

United Kingdom

In 2012, at a Limmud convention in Nazareth Illit organized to commemorate the 40th anniversary of the Munich massacre, Helfgott was awarded a prize by the mayor.

In 2018, Helfgott was appointed a Knight Bachelor in recognition of his contribution to services to Holocaust remembrance and education.

In October 2020, Helfgott was awarded the Pride of Britain award by Stephen Fry; the 2020 event was held at the Holocaust Memorial in Hyde Park because of the coronavirus pandemic.

See also
List of Jews in sports

References

External links
 

1929 births
Living people
People from Pabianice
Sportspeople from Łódź Voivodeship
20th-century Polish Jews
Jewish weightlifters
Polish people of World War II
Maccabiah Games medalists in weightlifting
Weightlifters at the 1956 Summer Olympics
Weightlifters at the 1960 Summer Olympics
Olympic weightlifters of Great Britain
British male weightlifters
Polish male weightlifters
Commonwealth Games bronze medallists for England
Weightlifters at the 1958 British Empire and Commonwealth Games
Polish emigrants to the United Kingdom
Maccabiah Games gold medalists for Great Britain
Buchenwald concentration camp survivors
Theresienstadt Ghetto survivors
Knights of the Order of Merit of the Republic of Poland
Competitors at the 1950 Maccabiah Games
Competitors at the 1953 Maccabiah Games
Competitors at the 1957 Maccabiah Games
Commonwealth Games medallists in weightlifting
Knights Bachelor
Members of the Order of the British Empire
Medallists at the 1958 British Empire and Commonwealth Games